Victor Ray Ennis is a sound editor.

On January 24, 2012, he was nominated for an Academy Award for the movie Drive. He shared his nomination with Lon Bender.

References

External links

Sound editors
Living people
Year of birth missing (living people)
Place of birth missing (living people)